Margie Foote (December 23, 1929 – August 29, 2012) was an American politician.

Career
She served in the Nevada Assembly from 1966 to 1974 and in the Nevada Senate from 1974 to 1978.

Death
She died on August 29, 2012, in Sparks, Nevada at age 82.

References

1929 births
2012 deaths
Democratic Party members of the Nevada Assembly
Democratic Party Nevada state senators